Sundaramudayan or Seeniappa dargah or Dargah valasai is a coastal village near Uchipuli in Ramanathapuram district.

There is a Naval base of the Indian Navy here.

References

Villages in Ramanathapuram district
Sufi shrines in India
Ziyarat
Dargahs in India
Dargahs in Tamil Nadu
Erwadi-related dargahs